The 1952 All-Big Ten Conference football team consists of American football players selected to the All-Big Ten Conference teams selected by the Associated Press (AP) and United Press (UP) for the 1952 Big Ten Conference football season.

Offensive selections

Ends
 Joe Collier, Northwestern (AP-1; UP-1)
 Bernard Flowers, Purdue (AP-1; UP-1)

Tackles
 George Jacoby, Ohio State (AP-1)
 David Suminski, Wisconsin (AP-1)
 Ray Huizinga, Northwestern (UP-1)

Guards
 James Reichenbach, Ohio State (AP-1)
 Robert Timm, Michigan (AP-1)
 George O'Brien, Wisconsin (UP-1)

Centers
 Walter Cudzik, Purdue (AP-1)
 Dick O'Shaughnessy, Michigan (UP-1)

Backs
 Alan Ameche, Wisconsin (AP-1; UP-1)
 Paul Giel, Minnesota (AP-1; UP-1)
 Tommy O'Connell, Illinois (AP-1; UP-1 [quarterback])
 George Gedman, Indiana (AP-1)
 Ted Kress, Michigan (UP-1)

Defensive selections

Ends
 Bill Fenton, Iowa (AP-1)
 Frank Wodziak, Illinois (AP-1)

Tackles
 Fred Preziosio, Purdue (AP-1)
 Art Walker, Michigan (AP-1)

Guards
 Bob Kennedy, Wisconsin (AP-1; UP-1)
 Percy Zachary, Minnesota (AP-1)

Linebackers
 Roger Zatkoff, Michigan (AP-1; UP-1 [tackle])
 Tony Curcillo, Ohio State (AP-1)

Backs
 Fred Bruney, Ohio State (AP-1)
 Robert McNamara, Minnesota (AP-1)

Safeties
 Al Brosky, Illinois (AP-1)

Key
AP = Associated Press, "selected with the cooperation of conference coaches"

UP = United Press

Bold = Consensus first-team selection of the AP and UP

See also
1952 College Football All-America Team

References

All-Big Ten Conference
All-Big Ten Conference football teams